Born in Cootamundra, New South Wales, Australia on 5 February 1946, Eric Fraser Ainsworth (known as Fraser Ainsworth) was a South Australian businessperson active in the energy and resources sectors. He received a Centenary Medal in 2001 and became a Member of the Order of Australia in 2003. He retired from his position as chairman of Horizon Oil Ltd in 2015 and was inducted into the Australian Institute of Energy's Hall of Fame the same year.

In March 2017, Ainsworth signed an open letter calling for the Government of South Australia to continue to investigate the "opportunity to develop an international used nuclear fuel management industry" identified by the Nuclear Fuel Cycle Royal Commission in 2015-16.

Ainsworth died in Adelaide, South Australia on Monday 7 June 2021.

Personal life 
Fraser Ainsworth and his wife Kelly placed their Millswood home on the market in June 2017 with an anticipated sale price of $AUD 3.5-3.7 million.

References 

Living people
Australian businesspeople
Year of birth missing (living people)
People from South Australia